Steal the Night is a live CD/DVD by Canadian jazz singer Holly Cole that was released in 2012 in Canada by Alert Records. This is her first live DVD release. It was recorded at Glenn Gould Studio in Toronto on August 11, 2011. The performance marked the reformation of the Holly Cole Trio with Aaron Davis on piano and David Piltch on bass, in addition to John Johnson (horns), Rob Piltch (guitar), and David DiRenzo (drums).

Track listing
CD
 "Down, Down, Down" (Tom Waits) – 3:52
 "Smile" (Charlie Chaplin) – 4:24
 "Charade" (Henry Mancini, Johnny Mercer) – 3:54
 "Good Time Charlie" (Danny O'Keefe) – 4:04
 "Larger Than Life" (Holly Cole) – 4:23
 "Calling You" (Rober Eria) – 4:24
 "Cry (If You Want To)" (Casey Scott) – 3:55
 "You've Got A Secret" (Holly Cole) – 5:01
 "I Can See Clearly Now" (Johnny Nash) – 4:40
DVD
 "Charade" (Henry Mancini, Johnny Mercer)
 "Good Time Charlie" (Danny O'Keefe)
 "Cry (If You Want To)" (Casey Scott)
 "Calling You" (Rober Eria)
 "Down Down Down" (Tom Waits)
 "Smile" (Charlie Chaplin)
 "Larger Than Life" (Holly Cole)
 "Train Song"(Tom Waits)
 "Tea For Two"(Irving Caesar, Vincent Youmans)
 "You've Got A Secret"(Holly Cole)
 "I Can See Clearly Now"(Johnny Nash)
Bonus Track
"I'd Like You For Christmas" (Bobby Troup)

References

Holly Cole albums
2012 live albums
Alert Records albums